Rock Falls is an unincorporated community in the town of Rock Creek, Dunn County, Wisconsin, United States.

One of the community's attractions is the nearby Rock Falls Raceway, a drag racing track. Rock Falls' ZIP Code is 54764.

References

External links
 Rock Falls, Wisconsin: A Photo History
 Rock Falls Raceway

Unincorporated communities in Dunn County, Wisconsin
Unincorporated communities in Wisconsin